Bullocktown is an unincorporated community in Boon Township, Warrick County, in the U.S. state of Indiana.

History
An old variant name of the community was Bullock. A post office was established under the name Bullock in 1892, and remained in operation until 1903. John A. Bullock served as an early postmaster, and gave the community his name.

Geography

References

Unincorporated communities in Warrick County, Indiana
Unincorporated communities in Indiana